Erik Sætter-Lassen (15 July 1892 – 24 December 1966) was a Danish sport shooter who competed at the 1920, 1924, 1936 and 1948 Summer Olympics.

1920 Antwerp
In 1920 he won the gold medal as member of the Danish team in the team 300 metre military rifle, standing event.

In the Summer Olympics he also participated in the following events:
 300 metre military rifle, standing - fourth place
 Team 50 metre small-bore rifle - fourth place
 50 metre small-bore rifle - place unknown
 300 metre military rifle, prone - result unknown

1924 Paris
In the 1924 Summer Olympics he participated in the following events:
 50 metre rifle, prone - fourth place
 Team free rifle - sixth place
 600 metre free rifle - 46th place

1936 Berlin
In 1936, he finished 15th in the 50 metre rifle, prone event and 22nd in the 25 metre rapid fire pistol competition.

References

1966 deaths
1892 births
Danish male sport shooters
ISSF rifle shooters
ISSF pistol shooters
Olympic shooters of Denmark
Shooters at the 1920 Summer Olympics
Shooters at the 1924 Summer Olympics
Shooters at the 1936 Summer Olympics
Shooters at the 1948 Summer Olympics
Olympic gold medalists for Denmark
Olympic medalists in shooting
Medalists at the 1920 Summer Olympics